Daydreaming is fantasizing while awake.

Daydreaming, Daydreamin', Day Dreaming or Day Dreamin' may also refer to:

Albums 
 [[Daydreamin' (Before Dark album)|Daydreamin (Before Dark album)]], 2000
 [[Daydreamin' (Dynasty album)|Daydreamin''' (Dynasty album)]], 1986
 Daydreaming (Morris Day album), 1987
 Daydreaming (Rafael Anton Irisarri album), 2007
 Day Dreamin, a 1977 album by Leslie Cheung
 The former name of Ariana Grande's debut album, Yours Truly Songs 
 "Day Dreaming" (Aretha Franklin song), 1972
 "Day Dreaming" (DJ Drama song), 2009
 "Daydreaming" (Kid Sister song), 2010
 "Daydreamin'" (Lupe Fiasco song), 2006
 "Daydreaming" (Massive Attack song), 1990
 "Daydreaming" (Paramore song), a song by Paramore from their fourth album Paramore "Daydreaming" (Radiohead song), a 2016 song by Radiohead
 "Daydreamin'" (Tatyana Ali song), 1998
 "Daydreaming/Choose Me", a 2017 double single by Band-Maid
 "Daydreamin'", a song by Ariana Grande from Yours Truly "Daydreamin'", a song by MC Solaar from Paradisiaque "Daydreaming", a song by Harry Styles from Harry's House''

See also 
 Daydream (disambiguation)
 Daydreamer (disambiguation)